The Green Brigade are a Celtic F.C. supporter ultra group formed in 2006. They are situated in the North Curve corner section of Celtic Park.

Controversy 

At a match against Dundee United in November 2010, there was serious disorder in the section occupied by the Green Brigade when a supporter was being ejected by stewards. Supporters charged at the security guards and one was left with a bloody lip after a coin was reportedly thrown.

In April 2011 at the Scottish Cup semi-final against Aberdeen, police officers attempted to remove a supporter who had set off a flare inside the stadium. Police were unable to remove the supporter because other fans held onto him. Four supporters were later held by police in connection with the incident. More than 100 Green Brigade members walked out of the stadium in protest at the arrests.

In April 2011 some members of the Green Brigade were not sent season ticket renewal forms after the club threatened to disperse the group around other sections of the stadium.	

UEFA head of communications William Gaillard, when talking about the matter in 2006, said that chants related to the IRA were not sectarian, and was a nationalist issue – similar to fans of other clubs, such as FC Barcelona and Athletic Bilbao, who support nationalist movements in their own countries. He also stated that in Balkan countries, where some fans show support for political organisations that had engaged in ethnic cleansing, was the situation different because these organisations were by their nature discriminatory. He said that in his opinion this did not apply to the Irish Republican Army (IRA). Former Celtic manager David Hay has called for singing of IRA anthems to be banned, while another former Celtic manager Neil Lennon has also repeatedly said that the chants embarrass the club.

During a match at Celtic Park between Celtic F.C. and St Mirren F.C. on 11 February 2023, the Green Brigade displayed a banner reading "VAR decision: Douglas Ross is a cunt," targeting assistant referee Douglas Ross, who is also a Member of Parliament and leader of the Scottish Conservatives.

Poppy protest 

At a match against Aberdeen in November 2010, the Green Brigade unfurled two banners with the words "Your deeds would shame all the devils in Hell. Ireland, Iraq, Afghanistan. No bloostained poppy on our Hoops." This protest was against the placing of the remembrance poppy on Celtic's shirt for the match against St Mirren on 11 November 2010.

The Green Brigade cited civilian deaths caused by the Armed Forces in the wars in Iraq and Afghanistan as well as Bloody Sunday, highlighting that the Saville Inquiry report "confirmed that 14 unarmed civilians were murdered in Derry in 1972 by the Paratroop Regiment".

The Glasgow Herald reported that in the weeks leading up to the incident, the Green Brigade had stepped up pro-IRA chants. Celtic has been investigated by UEFA in the past for alleged sectarian behaviour, including pro-IRA chants.

Veteran reporter Robert Fisk praised Celtic fans' reaction to the poppy, claiming it had become a 'symbol of racism' and as such the Green Brigade should be commended for their stance.

Support for Black Lives Matter 

In response to the murder of George Floyd, the Green Brigade supported the Black Lives Matter movement and changed a number of streets signs in Glasgow - renaming them after prominent black civil rights leaders and activists.

Palestinian solidarity 
On Celtic's last game of the 2011–12 season, the Green Brigade organised a display of solidarity with Palestinian prisoners on hunger strike. This featured a banner reading "Dignity is More Precious than Food" alongside Palestinian flags. A spokesman for the Brigade stated: "We did this in solidarity, to raise awareness and because it's the right thing to do. We want Palestinians to know we are thinking about them and encourage Scottish civil society to look at the injustice in Palestine."

Celtic were fined £8,619 by UEFA for supporters flying Palestinian flags at an August 2016 UEFA Champions League qualifying match against Hapoel Be'er Sheva at Celtic Park. The Green Brigade crowdfunded £176,000 in response, the balance of which it donated to Palestinian charities.

Appreciation from Neil Lennon 

The Green Brigade expressed solidarity with Celtic manager Neil Lennon, who in 2011 had been attacked on the trackside by a Hearts supporter at Tynecastle and allegedly been sent letter bombs. After the last match of the 2011–12 season, Lennon 'presented' the Scottish Premier League trophy to the Green Brigade by placing it in front of the section where they sit. He later said, "I just wanted to say thank you to them because they have, week in, week out, created a great atmosphere. They sing non-stop. They add colour. Sometimes they are a little bit controversial but in the main they have behaved themselves impeccably and they have changed the culture of the stadium. It's a fun place to come for the supporters and the atmosphere in the big games has been fantastic. They are the catalyst for all of that."

125th anniversary display 
In November 2012, the Green Brigade organised a full stadium pre-match card display against Barcelona to celebrate Celtic's 125th anniversary. The display featured a Celtic cross, green and white hoops and 125 Celtic in written form, with supporters earning the praise of club chairman Peter Lawwell.

Fans Against Criminalisation Protests 

On 6 April 2013, the Green Brigade took part in a demonstration comprising 3,000 Celtic supporters as part of Fans Against Criminalisation, a body comprising the Green Brigade, the Celtic Trust, Celtic Supporters Association, the Affiliation of Registered Celtic Supporters Clubs and the Association of Irish Celtic Supporters Clubs. Although the march to Celtic Park after the demonstration had not been granted permission, raising concerns about dispersal amongst police, after the event Police Scotland said they were "delighted" by the conduct of the protesters. The protest was organised after a previous march that had not received council permission was broken up by police on 16 March.

The initial protest had been called over supporters receiving bans and what was described as "harassment by the police". The Green Brigade announced on its website that it would be holding a "corteo to Celtic Park to raise awareness and show support for the growing list of Celtic supporters receiving and facing bans from both the Club and the PF. It is no secret the level of harassment many fans receive at the hands of Strathclyde Police nor is Celtic PLCs complicity able to be ignored. As such there is an ever growing list of fans being denied their passion of following their team." Fans took to social media after the initial protest, posting pictures of mounted police and a group of supporters surrounded by police with batons being prevented from leaving the area. Celtic fans felt that the initial demonstration had been improperly policed and turned out to show their support for those demonstrators. The Offensive Behaviour at Football and Threatening Communications (Scotland) Act 2012, which gave rise to the protests, was eventually repealed in April 2018.

Celtic move to disband Green Brigade 

Celtic made moves to disband the Green Brigade section at Parkhead after trouble at a match against Motherwell at Fir Park on 9 December 2013, where fans damaged the stadium seating and threw flares onto the pitch, causing around £10,000 worth of damage. Celtic had already issued a warning to the group after safety breaches in August 2013, and following the incident at Fir Park, Celtic issued "precautionary" suspensions to 128 supporters. 250 season-ticket holders in the group's adopted section of the Celtic Park, section 111, were moved to other parts of the ground, or given the option of a refund for the rest of the season.

"We will not allow the great name of Celtic to be damaged in this way – our supporters deserve more than this," said Celtic in a statement. The Green Brigade disputed the decision of the club and argued that its members were not responsible for the damage, but added it should have been more effective in self-policing.

UEFA sanctions 

Between 2011 and 2017, Celtic were punished with substantial fines by UEFA ten times for "misconduct from supporters during European ties".

In December 2013 UEFA issued the club with a €50,000 (£42,000) fine as a result of a banner unveiled by the Green Brigade at a UEFA Champions League match against AC Milan which displayed a political message (UEFA rules prohibit the display of banners of a political or ideological nature). The banner attracted further controversy for the use of the image of IRA hunger striker Bobby Sands.

During the 2017–18 season, the second qualifying round draw set up an all-United Kingdom clash with Belfast club Linfield. In the leg held at Windsor Park, some Linfield supporters threw bottles and coins at Celtic players and sang sectarian songs. During the return fixture, "illicit banner" displays were produced and UEFA charged Celtic again. The banner "showed a paramilitary-type figure" next to an image of Brendan Rodgers, the Northern Irish manager of Celtic, under the words "Brendan's undefeated army"; the Daily Record accused the Green Brigade of designing the flags, and also claimed that the "undertones of the imagery were also clearly referring to the politics of Ireland while a section of Celtic fans were also heard singing pro-IRA songs during the powderkeg tie with the Belfast side. Linfield are seen as a Protestant Unionist club in Northern Ireland and fans of both sides had earlier hurled abuse at each other as they made their way into the stadium". Celtic elected to close off the zone that holds the Green Brigade for the following two matches.

References

Celtic F.C.
Ultras groups
Anti-Zionism in the United Kingdom
Irish republicans